Juanito Rubillar (born February 22, 1977 in Barangay Central, Mati, Davao Oriental, Philippines) is a Filipino former professional boxer and current WBC Continental Americas light flyweight champions.

He is the younger brother of fellow boxer Ernesto Rubillar and older brother of Robert Rubillar.

Born in Davao Oriental, Rubillar lives in Sucat, Parañaque, Metro Manila.

Professional career
A veteran fighter, Rubillar made his professional debut on July 23, 1994, against fellow Filipino boxer Ramil Gevero. The fight ended with a draw, after 4 rounds.

Just like Bert Batawang, Rubillar suffered multiple losses and draws early in his career, but did not give up.

Recent fights
On February 27, 2010, Rubillar lost to South African boxer Hekkie Budler by a controversial Majority decision at the Emperors Casino in Kempton Park, Gauteng, South Africa. The bout was for the vacant International Boxing Organization light flyweight title .

The undefeated Budler started aggressively to take control of the early rounds, while Rubillar came back in the fourth and connected with a number of solid body shots as Budler took the defensive. Leading with his head as much as with his gloves which is Rubillar’s style, the veteran Filipino staggered Budler on a number of occasions and while referee Pete Podgorski cautioned the Filipino a couple of times for using his head, he did not penalize Rubillar. The Filipino fighter took the pace in the seventh round and hammered Budler with solid hooks to the body and although Budler stayed on his feet he did not regain control of the fight although the official scorecards told a different story and gave Budler a win by Majority decision. Two out of three judges gave the fight 117-113 and 115-113 for Budler, while the third judge scored the bout even at 114-114. Rubillar's promoter and boxing manager Gabriel “Bebot” Elorde (son of the legendary Flash Elorde) sayd he will file a protest with the IBO over what was widely perceived to be a hometown decision in the IBF light flyweight title eliminator. He finally got a rematch, after Elorde's protest, which as in the previous bout, he also lost.

References

External links 

1977 births
Living people
Light-flyweight boxers
Flyweight boxers
People from Davao Oriental
Southpaw boxers
Filipino male boxers